Central Province is a province in Papua New Guinea located on the southern coast of the country. The seat of government of Central Province, which is located within the National Capital District outside the province, is the Port Moresby suburb of Konedobu. On 9 October 2007, the Central Province government announced plans to build a new provincial capital city at Bautama, which lies within Central Province near Port Moresby, although there has been little progress in constructing it.

Whereas Tok Pisin is the main lingua franca in all Papua New Guinean towns, in part of the southern mainland coastal area centred on Central Province, Hiri Motu is a stronger lingua franca (but not in Port Moresby).

Districts and LLGs
Each province in Papua New Guinea has one or more districts, and each district has one or more Local Level Government (LLG) areas. For census purposes, the LLG areas are subdivided into wards and those into census units.

Provincial leaders

The province was governed by a decentralised provincial administration, headed by a Premier, from 1976 to 1995. Following reforms taking effect that year, the national government reassumed some powers, and the role of Premier was replaced by a position of Governor, to be held by the winner of the province-wide seat in the National Parliament of Papua New Guinea.

Premiers (1976–1995)

Governors (1995–present)

Members of the National Parliament

The province and each district is represented by a Member of the National Parliament.  There is one provincial electorate and each district is an open electorate.

Notable people 

 Julia Mage’au Gray (born 1973) - choreographer and tattoo artist.

Sources/further reading
 Hanson, L.W., Allen, B.J., Bourke, R.M. and McCarthy, T.J. (2001). Papua New Guinea Rural Development Handbook. Land Management Group, Research School of Pacific and Asian Studies, The Australian National University, Canberra. Available as a 30 Megabyte PDF.

References

 
Provinces of Papua New Guinea
Southern Region, Papua New Guinea

eo:Okcidenta Provinco (Papuo)